This is a list of political parties in Chechnya, both past and present. It does not include independents.

Active parties

Historical parties 

Russia politics-related lists
Chechnya